The Ceram rat (Nesoromys ceramicus) is a species of rodent in the family Muridae.
It is found only in Seram Island, Indonesia, where it has been recorded on Mount Mansuela.

References

Sources

Old World rats and mice
Mammals described in 1920
Taxonomy articles created by Polbot
Taxa named by Oldfield Thomas